"Happy Home" is a song by Danish DJ Hedegaard featuring the vocals of Lukas Graham. The song was co-written by Hedegaard himself and Lukas Graham Forchhammer (Lukas Graham). Released on Copenhagen Records in association with Universal Music Denmark, it reached number one on Hitlisten, the Danish Official Singles Chart.

The song received heavy play on the Danish radio station P3 and was put in heavy rotation on several other Danish radio stations. On streaming and sale, it was number one for several weeks in Denmark and now has accumulated more than 31 million streams total (until February 2015).

After a performance of the song on the Norwegian talk show Senkveld med Thomas og Harald, it became number one on the Norwegian iTunes and was certified 3× Platinum on streaming in Norway. and peaked at number four on VG-lista, the official Norwegian Singles Chart. It also cracked the top 40 on Sverigetopplistan, the official Swedish Singles Chart.

Awards
In 2014, Hedegaard won a Danish Grammy as "Producer of the Year" for the hit "Happy Home" during the Danish Music Awards 2014.

Charts

References

2014 singles
2014 songs
Lukas Graham songs
Copenhagen Records singles
Universal Music Group singles
Number-one singles in Denmark
Songs written by Lukas Forchhammer
Songs written by Hedegaard (DJ)
Music videos shot in Bulgaria